The life of church reformer and theologian Martin Luther (November 10, 1483 - February 18, 1546) has inspired a number of adaptations of the events of the Reformation for both television and film.  Some of these have been large-budget, major studio productions, while others have been produced by local Lutheran church bodies.

Film

Television

Theatre

References